Steenberg is a small community in the Southern Suburbs of Cape Town, South Africa. It has a population of slightly more than 4,000 and mainly includes those belonging to the Cape Coloured community. The main center of the suburb is Military Road, which runs from west connecting Tokai and Kirstenhof at the M4 Main Road and then east into the M5 which provides access to Muizenberg and various other northern suburbs including Bellville and Century City. Military Road has many small businesses lining its south side but also one of South Africa's largest retailers, Shoprite, which has a branch located close to the M5.

Geography
Steenberg is located near the False Bay coast.  It is bounded to the south by Lakeside and Muizenberg, west by Tokai, east by Lavender Hill and Seawinds (which are extensions of Steenberg), and north by Retreat and Heathfield. The Sand River runs through it which springs in the Zandvlei Estuary Nature Reserve in Muizenberg and is an important conservation area.

Steenberg is home to one of the last remaining sites of the Western Leopard Toad.

References

Suburbs of Cape Town